Thanh Xuân is an urban district (quận) of Hanoi, the capital city of Vietnam. The district currently has 11 wards, covering a total area of 9.09 square kilometers. As of 2019, there were 293,524 people residing in the district, the population density is 32,000 inhabitants per square kilometer. The district is mostly residential and also contains several universities.

Geography
Thanh Xuân is located at 20° 59′ 36.24″ N, 105° 47′ 54.6″ E, bordered by Đống Đa to the north, Hai Bà Trưng to the east, Hoàng Mai and Thanh Trì to the south, Hà Đông and  South Từ Liêm to the southwest, and Cầu Giấy to the northwest.

Administrative Division
Thanh Xuân district is divided into 11 wards: Hạ Đình, Khương Đình, Khương Mai, Khương Trung, Kim Giang, Nhân Chính, Phương Liệt, Thanh Xuân Bắc, Thanh Xuân Nam, Thanh Xuân Trung and Thượng Đình.

Education
VNU University of Science
VNU University of Social Sciences and Humanities
Hanoi University
Hanoi Architectural University
National University of Art Education
University Of Transport Technology
National Academy of Education Management

References

Districts of Hanoi